Chrysotus subcostatus is a species of long-legged fly in the family Dolichopodidae.

References

Diaphorinae
Articles created by Qbugbot
Insects described in 1864
Taxa named by Hermann Loew